Jonelle Filigno (born September 24, 1990) is a Canadian soccer player who last played for Sky Blue FC in the National Women's Soccer League.
She played for the Canadian national team, with whom she won an Olympic bronze medal at London 2012.

Playing career

Clubs

Sky Blue FC
After finishing her collegiate career at Rutgers University, Filigno was allocated to NWSL side Sky Blue FC. She made her debut on April 27, 2014, as a second-half substitute in a 3–2 road defeat to the Boston Breakers at Harvard Stadium. She scored her first professional goal in a 3–3 draw against the Washington Spirit on May 21, 2014, at Maryland SoccerPlex.

International
Filigno made her senior debut for Canada on January 16, 2008, at an age of 17. She played for Canada at the 2008 Olympics and 2011 FIFA Women's World Cup. At the 2012 Olympics, Filigno scored the winning goal against Great Britain in the knockout stage of the tournament, a stunning volley from a Sophie Schmidt corner kick. She was subsequently awarded an Olympic bronze medal after Canada defeated France in the Third Place match. Filigno made her last appearance for the national team at the 2015 FIFA Women's World Cup and officially retired from international football in 2017.

International goals

Honor

International 
CONCACAF Women's Championship: 2010

Personal
Filigno attended Rutgers University, where she is the all-time leading scorer of game-winning goals, with 17. Jonelle's father was born in Etobicoke, Ontario while her mother is from Georgetown, Guyana. Jonelle was four years old when she started playing soccer in north Mississauga.  She grew up participating in soccer, basketball, volleyball, and cross-country running.

References

Match reports

External links
 Jonelle Filigno profile at National Women's Soccer League
 Jonelle Filigno profile at Sky Blue FC
 

1990 births
Living people
Soccer players from Mississauga
Canadian sportspeople of Guyanese descent
Canadian women's soccer players
Canada women's international soccer players
Canadian expatriate women's soccer players
Expatriate women's soccer players in the United States
Footballers at the 2008 Summer Olympics
Footballers at the 2012 Summer Olympics
Olympic soccer players of Canada
Vancouver Whitecaps FC (women) players
USL W-League (1995–2015) players
Olympic medalists in football
Olympic bronze medalists for Canada
Medalists at the 2012 Summer Olympics
NJ/NY Gotham FC players
National Women's Soccer League players
Rutgers Scarlet Knights women's soccer players
2015 FIFA Women's World Cup players
Canadian expatriate sportspeople in the United States
Women's association football midfielders
Women's association football forwards
2011 FIFA Women's World Cup players
Toronto Lady Lynx players